Country Music is the 11th studio album of American country singer Marty Stuart, released in 2003. With his previous album The Pilgrim, Stuart established himself as a serious recording artist and an accomplished musician. For this album he formed a new backing band called the Fabulous Superlatives. To date, Marty and his Superlatives are still touring, recording, and performing on The Marty Stuart Show on RFD-TV.

The members of the band are:
 'Cousin' Kenny Vaughan - Guitar
 'Handsome' Harry Stinson - Drums
 'Brother' Brian Glenn - Bass (who would later be replaced by 'The Apostle' Paul Martin, who was subsequently replaced by 'Professor' Chris Scruggs)

Though the album was a commercial success, Stuart later claimed he was unhappy with the album, and said he was "guilty of trying to have a hit".

The track "Too Much Month (At The End of the Money)" was originally recorded by the writers of the song (Bob DiPiero, Dennis Robbins, and John Scott Sherrill) when they formed the band Billy Hill. Their version was a hit in 1989 and it was the only Top 40 hit for them, it peaked at No. 25 on the charts and it was released as their debut single and lead off single to their album "I Am Just a Rebel".

Track listing

Personnel

Marty Stuart & His Fabulous Superlatives
Brian Glenn - background vocals
Harry Stinson - drums, tambourine, background vocals
Marty Stuart - fiddle, acoustic guitar, electric guitar, mandolin, lead vocals
Kenny Vaughan - acoustic guitar, electric guitar

Additional Musicians
Tommy Douglas - background vocals
Stuart Duncan - fiddle
Brian Glenn - background vocals
Josh Graves - dobro
Merle Haggard - duet vocals on "Farmer's Blues"
Tony Harrell - accordion, clavichord, Hammond organ, piano
Russ Pahl - banjo, steel guitar
Alison Prestwood - bass guitar
Michael Rhodes - bass guitar
Earl Scruggs - banjo
Robby Turner - steel guitar

Chart performance

2003 albums
Marty Stuart albums
Columbia Records albums